Dull may refer to:


Places
 Dull, Perth and Kinross, Scotland, United Kingdom, a village
 Dull, Ohio, United States, an unincorporated community
 Dull, Texas, United States, a ghost town

People
 Jack Dull (1930–1995), American professor, scholar of the history of Han China
 Orville O. Dull (1888–1978), American film producer and director
 Ryan Dull (born 1989), American Major League Baseball pitcher

Other uses
 Dull Gret, a figure of Flemish folklore

See also
 Hugh the Dull, Lord of Douglas (1294 – between 1342 and 1346), Scottish nobleman and cleric
 Dullness, in medicine